Homey is a smart home hub manufactured by the Dutch company Athom B.V. Homey has an app interface with an open API that allows third-party developers to add support for their products in Homey. Like other smart home hubs, the purpose of Homey is to act as a central point of configuration, control and monitoring of components in a smart home. An automatic control flow is nicknamed a "Flow" in the Homey app.

History 
Homey was originally started as a Kickstarter project in May 2014, and the company Athom B.V. was founded to take care of the development. In 2015, private investors invested 1 million euro in the company.

Models

Homey (1st generation) 
In 2016, the first version of the Homey was released after having started as a Kickstarter project in 2014. The first generation of Homey had a built-in microphone and software for speech recognition, and as such could be regarded as both a smart speaker and a smart home hub. It had support for connecting over Wi-Fi, Bluetooth, ZigBee, Z-Wave, 433 MHz, 868 MHz and infrared light.

Homey (2nd generation) 
In 2019, the second generation of Homey was released. Notable hardware changes includes removal of the near-field communication module due to little use, as well as removal of the microphone because Homey had deemed it to not be good enough to function as planned.

The software was also updated to version 2.0, and older equipment could also be upgraded to this version. Some of the changes in the software was a more complete mobile app, while support for the desktop application was removed. Support was added for lighting control using KNX. The Homey second generation had a hardware with 512 MB random-access memory and a single core central processing unit.

Homey Pro 
Homey Pro was also launched in 2019 at the same time as the second generation of the Homey base model, but the Pro edition had a twice as powerful hardware with 1 GB of random-access memory and a dual core prosessor.

Supported devices 
The Homey software has partial support for integration with selected components from other smart home systems, such as Philips Hue, Google Nest, Chromecast, Logitech Harmony, Spotify Connect and Sonos One. 

Homey claims to support over 50 000 different devices from over 1000 brands.

See also 
 Home Assistant
 Google Nest
 Apple HomePod
 Internet of Things

References 

Smart home hubs